Jesus Rosado (born 2 September 1967) is a Spanish racing cyclist. He rode in the 1990 Tour de France.

References

External links
 

1967 births
Living people
Spanish male cyclists
Place of birth missing (living people)
People from Ronda
Sportspeople from the Province of Málaga
Cyclists from Andalusia